Obliterated is an upcoming American action dramedy streaming television series created by Jon Hurwitz, Hayden Schlossberg, and Josh Heald.  The series stars Nick Zano and Shelley Hennig. It is set to premiere on Netflix, running for eight episodes.

Premise 
An elite team is assembled from various branches of the US armed forces to stop a deadly terrorist network from blowing up Las Vegas.  They complete the mission and celebrate with a night on the town, filled with sex, drugs, and alcohol.  They discover that the bomb they neutralized was fake, so the team must fight through their intoxication to find the real one and save the day.

Cast

Main 
 Nick Zano as Chad McKnight, a Navy SEAL team leader
 Shelley Hennig as Ava Winters, a CIA agent
 Terrence Terrell as Trunk, a Navy SEAL
 Alyson Gorske as Lana, a civilian party girl
 C. Thomas Howell as Haggerty, Army explosives technician
 Eugene Kim as Paul Young, an Air Force pilot
 Paola Lázaro as Angela Gomez, a Marine sniper
 Kimi Rutledge as Maya Choi, an NSA agent

Recurring 
 Carl Lumbly as Langdon, Director of the CIA
 David Costabile as Maddox, a black-market operator
 Costa Ronin as Ivan Koslov, an arms dealer
 Lindsey Kraft as Yani, a lounge singer
 Tobias Jelinek as Ehren
 Minnie Mills as Jen, Paul's daughter

Guest 
 Virginia Madsen as Marge
 Lori Petty as Crazy Susan
 Clive Standen as Liam
 Ivan G'Vera as Vlad
 Keston John as Mr. Dugan

Production 
Cobra Kais Jon Hurwitz, Hayden Schlossberg, and Josh Heald created Obliterated under their overall deal at Sony Pictures Television with plans to write and executive produce the series as well.  In October 2019, TBS gave a straight-to-series order of ten episodes; however, the show was later moved from TBS to Netflix and reduced to eight episodes.  Nick Zano and Shelley Hennig were cast in the lead roles, and the main cast later added Terrence Terrell, Alyson Gorske, C. Thomas Howell, Eugene Kim, Paola Lázaro, and Kimi Rutledge.  Additional recurring roles and guest stars were announced in October 2022.

Filming began in July 2022, taking place in Las Vegas and Albuquerque.

References

External links 
 

American action television series
American comedy-drama television series
English-language Netflix original programming
Television series by Sony Pictures Television
Television shows set in Las Vegas
Television shows shot in the Las Vegas Valley
Television shows filmed in New Mexico
Upcoming comedy television series
Upcoming drama television series
Upcoming Netflix original programming
Works about the United States Navy SEALs